Davide Guglielmotti (born 24 March 1994) is an Italian professional footballer who plays as a winger for  club Reggiana.

Career
Born in Novara, Guglielmotti started his career in Pro Vercelli and Inter Milan youth sectors.

As a senior, in 2013 he signed with Serie C club Pro Patria. He made his professional debut on 26 January 2014 against AlbinoLeffe.

After two seasons in Pro Patria, on 2 July 2015 he moved to Cremonese.

He played one year for Cremonese, and on 27 July 2016 he joined to Pistoiese.

For the 2018–19 season, Guglielmotti signed with Renate. He played three seasons for Renate.

On 2 July 2021, he signed with Reggiana.

References

External links
 
 

1994 births
Living people
People from Novara
Footballers from Piedmont
Italian footballers
Association football wingers
Serie C players
Inter Milan players
Aurora Pro Patria 1919 players
U.S. Cremonese players
U.S. Pistoiese 1921 players
A.C. Renate players
A.C. Reggiana 1919 players
Sportspeople from the Province of Novara